The first season of Got to Dance - Tylko Taniec began on 3 March 2012 on Polsat. Dancers compete to win PLN 100,000.

The show airs on Polsat, also in HD, and is hosted by Maciej Dowbor, and Katarzyna Kępka The prize money is currently 100,000 PLN and right to perform on Sopot TOPtrendy Festival for the winning act.

Auditions
Every contestant had to perform on precasting. Then after moving on dancers were allowed to dance in front of show judges, who picked 30 finalists after all auditions.

Facebook voting

From Friday to Wednesday piątku after casting episodes Facebook fans can vote for their favorite performers. There are 10000 PLN to give away. 1% equals 100 PL.
Results:
Week 1: Caro Dance – 24%
Week 2: Top Toys – 22%
Week 3: Biohazard – 26%
Week 4: Scandal – 24%
Week 5: Soul Dance - 30%
Week 6: Rachu Ciachu - 26%

Semi-finalists
Judges picked 30 semi-finalists. 2 moved on to the final from each episode. There was also one wild card awarded by Facebook app users.

Soloists

Duets

Groups

Semi-finals

Semi-finale 1 (20 April 2012)

This episode Alan Andersz was unable to sit at the panel, due to his recent injury.

Results:
1st Place: Dawid Ignaczak
2nd Place: Takt Chadek Chełm

Semi-finale 2 (27 April 2012)

Results:
1st Place: Top Toys
2nd Place: Reprezentacyjny Zespół Pieśni i Tańca "Ziemia Myślenicka"

Semi-finale 3 (4 May 2012)

Results:
1st Place: Lollipops
2nd Place: Catch The Flava

Michał Malitowski was replaced at the panel by Filip Czeszyk. Michał didn't appear due to his preparations to Blackpool Open ballroom competition.
Jekaterina Romankowa & Justas Kucinskas didn't perform due to Jekaterina Romankowa's injury. They are planning to come back next season.

Wildcard Facebook voting
Results:
After Semi-finale 1: Only Boys - 45%
After Semi-finale 2: Caro Dance - 46%
After Semi-finale 3: Fair Play Kwadrat - 27%

After 3 semi-finals wild card was awarded to Caro Dance, which returns to the competition, as one of seven finalists.

Finale (11 May 2012)
Guest Dancer:
Theater Roma artists - "Singing in the Rain"
Joanna Leunis & Michał Malitowski

Round 1

Results:
Top Toys
Dawid Ignaczak

Round 2

Results:
Winner: Dawid Ignaczak
Runner-up: Top Toys

2012 Polish television seasons